Palasbari (Pron:ˌpəlæsˈbɑːrɪ) is a town and a municipal board in Kamrup district in the Indian state of Assam. There was a small Kachari kingdom near Palasbari Heramdoi. Palasbari has its own reputation  as it is the third Town of Assam.  People of Palasbari are very good and polite.

Geography
It has an average elevation of 46 metres (150 feet).

Demographics
 India census, Palasbari had a population of 4741. Males constitute 51% of the population and females 49%. Palasbari has an average literacy rate of 80%, higher than the national average of 59.5%: male literacy is 85%, and female literacy is 75%. In Palasbari, 9% of the population is under 6 years of age.
Palasbari is The 3rd town of Assam state. Currently, industrialization is taking place in and around Palasbari which has given a new impetus to this old town.

Sports

People

Politics
Palasbari is part of Gauhati (Lok Sabha constituency).
The people of Palasbari are traditionally well known for their political consciousness. Rationality is a major trait among the folk of this town.

See also 
 Mirza
 Chaygaon

References

Cities and towns in Kamrup district